Aspen is a common name for several species of trees in the genus Populus and for some in the genus Acronychia.

Aspen may also refer to:

Business
 Aspen Airways, a former airline that was based in Denver, Colorado
 Aspen Avionics, an American aircraft avionics manufacturer
 Aspen Comics, American entertainment company and comic book publisher
 Aspen Dental, a dental practice management corporation
 Aspen Education Group, a company that provides therapeutic interventions for adolescents and young adults
 Aspen Healthcare, a private medical company based in the City of London
 Aspen Medical, a global provider of health services based in Canberra, Australia
 Aspen MLT, an entertainment company
 Aspen Pharmacare, a multi-national pharmaceutical manufacturing company based in South Africa 
 Aspen Skiing Company, known locally as "Ski Co"
 Aspen Soda, an apple-flavored soft drink sold from 1978 until 1982
 Aspen Technology, an engineering software company

Arts and entertainment
 Aspen Art Museum, Aspen, Colorado
 Aspen Music Festival and School, a classical music festival
 Aspen Matthews, protagonist of the comic book series Fathom
 Aspen (magazine), a multimedia magazine of the arts published from 1965 to 1971

People
 Aspen (name), a list of people with the given name or surname

Places

United States
 Aspen, Colorado, a ski resort town
 Aspen/Snowmass, a winter resort complex in Pitkin County, Colorado
 Aspen Mountain (ski area), on the north slopes of Aspen Mountain
 Aspen Mountain (Colorado), south of the town of Aspen
 Aspen anomaly, a geological structure in Colorado
 Aspen Brook (Colorado), a tributary of the Big Thompson River
 Aspen Mountain (Wyoming), south of Rock Springs
 Aspen Lake, west of Klamath Falls, Oregon

Other countries
 Aspen, Nova Scotia, Canada, a community
 Queen Elizabeth II Island, formerly Aspen Island, Canberra, Australian Capital Territory, Australia
 Aspen, Botkyrka, a lake in Botkyrka Municipality, Sweden
 Aspen (Julita), a lake in Katrineholm Municipality, Sweden

Transportation
 Chrysler Aspen, a sport utility vehicle
 Dodge Aspen, a compact car
 Gradient Aspen, a Czech paraglider design
 Aspen (ship, 1947), see Boats of the Mackenzie River watershed

Other uses
 Aspen University, a for-profit, distance-learning university
 Aspen High School, Aspen, Colorado
 USCGC Aspen, a United States Coast Guard cutter
 Aspen, a type of cervical collar

See also
 Aspen Shale, a geologic formation in Wyoming
 Aspen hawk-moth
 Aspen Hall (disambiguation)
 Aspen Hill (disambiguation)
 Aspen Institute, an American nonprofit cultural organization
 Aspin (disambiguation)